Riverside is a ghost town in Reynolds County, in the U.S. state of Missouri.

Riverside was named for its location near the Black River.

References

Ghost towns in Missouri
Former populated places in Reynolds County, Missouri